France II was a French sailing ship, built by Chantiers et Ateliers de la Gironde and launched in 1912. In hull length and overall size she was, after , the second largest commercial merchant sailing ship ever built. An earlier sailing vessel named France had been built in 1890 by D. & W. Henderson & Son, Glasgow.

Design
France II was an extremely large tall ship, square rigged as a five-masted steel-hulled barque. Her masts, yards and spanker boom were made of steel tubing; lower mast and topmast were made in one piece. Her long yards and comparatively short masts gave her a rather wide and depressed appearance relative to other tall ships of her class.

Wood was used for her deck and furnishings.  She was fitted with a beautiful lounge equipped with a piano and precious furniture, seven luxury passenger cabins, a library, a darkroom, and seawater therapy equipment.

Her "three-island" deck-line was striking, with an extremely long poop deck similar to sail training ships, forecastle, and midship island, leaving only two short open upper deck sections, each containing one of her huge loading hatches.

History 
France II was built in 1911 at the yards of Chantiers et Ateliers de la Gironde on the banks of the river Garonne in Bordeaux to the plans of chief designer Gustave Leverne (1861–1940).  She was intended for the nickel ore trade and  owned by the Société Anonyme des Navires Mixtes (Prentout-Leblond, Leroux & Cie.). At that time she had the largest cargo capacity of any sailing ship ever built.

The huge barque was equipped with two Schneider  diesel engines, which were removed in 1919. Her crew consisted of 5 officers: captain, 2nd captain (on French ships only (second capitaine); a naval officer of a captain's rank as a vice-captain and security officer, see chief mate), 1st, 2nd, and 3rd mates and 40 able seamen including cook, steward, sailmaker, ship's carpenter, which was increased to 45 in 1919.

In 1915 she was sold to Leroux-Henzey of Rouen, and sold again in 1916 to the Compagnie Française de Marine et de Commerce (French Company of Marine and Trade) also of Rouen, her port of registry remained the same.

Because of fallen cargo rates her owner refused to pay for a tugboat to tow her free, and she was abandoned. In 1944, American bombers bombed the wreckage for target practice.

In 1995 planning started to raise funds to design and build a replica of France II, but by 2010 very little progress had been made.

Tall-ship cruise line Star Clippers launched a new ship based on France II named  on 10 June 2017.

See also
 List of tall ships
 List of large sailing vessels

Bibliography 
 Roger et Christian Bernadat: "France(II), le plus grand voilier du monde, construit à Bordeaux". Les Editions de l'Entre-deux-Mers, Saint-Quentin-de-Baron 2008 ; 
 Jochen Brennecke: Windjammer. Der große Bericht über die Entwicklung, Reisen und Schicksale der "Königinnen der Sieben Meere".  Koehlers Verlagsgesellschaft, Herford 1984; Kap. XXII - Die Größten unter den Segelschiffen der Welt, pp 299; 
 Hans-Jörg Furrer: Die Vier- und Fünfmast-Rahsegler der Welt.  Koehlers Verlagsgesellschaft, Herford 1984, pp 93; 
 Jean Randier: Grands voiliers français 1880-1930. Construction, gréement, manoeuvre, vie à bord. Editions des Quatre Seigneurs, Grenoble 1974;

External links
 French Ship Academy   Association dedicated to the building a replica of France II. Contains details of plans for a replica and also the history of France II. The site is written in both English and French.
    Tall ship cruise line "Star Clippers" press release regarding the build and launch of new ship based on the "France II".

 
Individual sailing vessels
Five-masted ships
1912 ships
Lost sailing vessels
Windjammers